ITPM can stand for:
 In the Pale Moonlight
 IT portfolio management